The Curtiss R2C was a racing aircraft designed for the United States Navy in 1923 by Curtiss. It was a single-seater biplane with a monocoque fuselage and staggered single-bay wings of unequal span braced with I-struts. The aircraft's advanced streamlining featured a top wing mounted directly to the top of the fuselage and surface-mounted radiators for cooling the engine. The aircraft was originally designed and built as a landplane under the Navy designation R2C-1,  of which two examples were produced. One was converted into a seaplane version known as the R2C-2 the following year.

Operational history

On 4 November 1923, Lieutenant Alford J. Williams, Jr., U.S. Navy, set a Fédération Aéronautique Internationale (FAI) World Record for Speed Over a 3-Kilometer Course of 429.03 kilometers per hour (266.59 miles per hour). (FAI Record File Number 8753) The second aircraft was sold shortly thereafter to the US Army for the token sum of $1. The Army designated it the R-8 and intended to race the aircraft against the Navy in the 1924 Pulitzer Trophy Race in Fairfield, Ohio, but it was destroyed in a crash during training shortly before the competition killing the pilot, First Lieutenant Alexander Pearson, Jr.

The remaining R2C had its wheeled undercarriage replaced by pontoons during 1924 in preparation for that year's Schneider Trophy race, but the event was cancelled due to a lack of competitors. The aircraft ended its days training pilots for the 1925 and 1926 Schneider Trophy races.

Variants
R2C-1Landplane racer, two built (A6691 and  A6692).
R2C-2Floatplane racer, one converted from A6692.

Operators

United States Navy
United States Army

Specifications (R2C-1)

See also

References

Further reading
 
 

1920s United States sport aircraft
R2C
Single-engined tractor aircraft
Racing aircraft
Aircraft first flown in 1923